Blinded (original Spanish title: A ciegas) is a 1997 romantic thriller directed and written by Daniel Calparsoro. The film's director Daniel Calparsoro was nominated for the Golden Lion award at the 1997 Venice International Film Festival, but lost to Takeshi Kitano's romantic film Hana-bi.

Plot
Marrubi (Najwa Nimri) works at a dry cleaners and must endure the unwanted advances of her boss Clemente (Ramón Barea). However, Marrubi is also a terrorist in the ETA with her lover, Mikel (Alfredo Villa). They target a wealthy businessman for a heist intending to kill him in the process. When Marrubi deliberately shoots her colleague instead of the intended victim, both she and Mikel are on the run. At Mikel's country house, matters are complicated by another one of their group who insists Marrubi be killed for her betrayal. She manages to escape with her son but is left to depend on Clemente who takes her into his mansion that he shares with his submissive wife Paquita (Marivi Bilbao). She must survive Clemente's continual advances while remaining wanted by the authorities.

Cast
 Najwa Nimri ... Marrubi
 Ramón Barea ... Clemente
 Alfredo Villa ... Mikel
 Elena Irureta ... Aitzpea
 Marivi Bilbao ... Paquita

External links

1997 films
Spanish romantic thriller films
1990s romantic thriller films